McGlothlin is a surname. It is an Anglicised form of the Gaelic MacLochlainn, meaning "son of Lochlann".

Notable people with the surname include:

Jean McGlothlin Doerge (b. 1937), American politician
Jim McGlothlin (1943–1975), American baseball player
Jim and Woodrow McGlothlin, father and son who founded United Coal Company
Michael McGlothlin (born 1951), American politician

See also
10638 McGlothlin, main-belt asteroid
McGlothin

English-language surnames